U.S. Route 54 (US 54) in Missouri is a west-east highway that starts from the Kansas state line in Nevada to the Illinois state line in Louisiana.

Route description

In Missouri, US 54 runs from the southwest portion of the state to the northeast. It is a major conduit through the Ozarks and is the primary access road to Pomme de Terre Lake and Lake of the Ozarks. 

After entering the state from neighboring Kansas, the route moves eastward through many rural towns and communities. It passes through Nevada, where it serves as the main access road to the town's business market. In Nevada, the route intersects with I-49 and US 71 as exits 102A and 102B on I-49/US 71. Here, it also passes by the Nevada Municipal Airport. Moving eastward, the route continues through El Dorado Springs, Collins, Weaubleau, and Wheatland where Lucas Oil Speedway is located. It passes through Hermitage and Preston, where it intersects with US 65 at a four way stop. It then passes through Macks Creek. 

The route continues eastward and begins to enter the areas surrounding the Lake of the Ozarks, a popular tourist destination and lake. It first crosses over the lake's Niangua Branch near Ha Ha Tonka State Park. It then passes through Camdenton. In Camdenton, the road intersects with MO 5 and MO 7 at an interchange. These routes provide access to Lebanon and I-44. After leaving Camdenton, the route becomes a four-lane divided highway and remains that way to Mexico. US 54 then passes through Linn Creek and enters Osage Beach. The route continues on a new expressway path initially built in 2010 and 2011. It crosses Lake of the Ozarks a second time on the Grand Glaize Bridge. The route then briefly enters Lake Ozark and Lakeland, although access to these towns is only provided by exits from the highway. The route then leaves the Lake of the Ozarks area before bypassing Eldon.

US 54 then goes through Jefferson City, where it crosses US 50 and crosses the Missouri River via the Jefferson City Bridge and briefly overlaps US 63. Just north of the bridge, it splits then leaves the Ozark Plateau before passing through Fulton, crossing I-70 and US 40 at Kingdom City, passes through Auxvasse, then bypassing Mexico where it turns into a two-lane highway. US 54 then turns right and continues on. At a roundabout, US 54 picks up a concurrency with Route 19 and then passes through Laddonia. North of Laddonia, US 54 splits from Route 19 before passing just north of Vandalia, bypasses Bowling Green crossing US 61, and ultimately crossing the Mississippi River via the Champ Clark Bridge into Illinois at Louisiana.

US 54 is a part of the National Highway System, a system of highways important to the nation's defense, economy, and mobility.

History
US 54 was originally formed in Missouri after changing from US 26, however the routing went from Cedar County to Polk County, then Dallas County, then into Camden County. In 1932, the highway was rerouted into Saint Clair County and then Hickory County, and paved over. 

In Macks Creeks, a well known speed trap existed on US 54 upon entering the town until 1995 when a law named Macks Creek Law was passed.

In the Lake of the Ozarks area, US 54 be rerouted onto a new 4 lane highway in 2010 and another part of US 54 was rerouted in 2011 in the Lake of the Ozarks area. The old US 54 was renamed "Osage Beach Parkway."

The original Champ Clark Bridge opened in 1928. In 2019, a replacement bridge opened and the old one was torn down.

Junction list

References

External links

54
 Missouri
Transportation in Vernon County, Missouri
Transportation in Cedar County, Missouri
Transportation in St. Clair County, Missouri
Transportation in Hickory County, Missouri
Transportation in Camden County, Missouri
Transportation in Miller County, Missouri
Transportation in Cole County, Missouri
Transportation in Callaway County, Missouri
Transportation in Audrain County, Missouri
Transportation in Pike County, Missouri